Corey Todd Taylor (born December 8, 1973) is an American musician, songwriter and actor. He is the lead vocalist of the heavy metal band Slipknot, in which he is designated #8, as well as the lead vocalist and guitarist for the rock band Stone Sour.

Taylor co-founded Stone Sour with drummer Joel Ekman in 1992, playing in the Des Moines, Iowa area, and working on a demo. He joined Slipknot in 1997 to replace their original lead singer Anders Colsefni and has subsequently released seven studio albums with them. After the first two Slipknot albums went Platinum, Taylor revived Stone Sour to record an album and tour in 2002. His debut solo studio album, CMFT, was released in 2020.

He has also worked with several other acts, including Junk Beer Kidnap Band, Korn, Disturbed, Apocalyptica, Code Orange, Anthrax, Steel Panther, Tonight Alive, Falling in Reverse, Soulfly, and The Clay People.

Early life
Corey Todd Taylor was born on December 8, 1973, in Des Moines, Iowa. He was mostly raised by his single mother in Waterloo, Iowa, and described it as a "hole in the ground with buildings around it". He is of German, Irish and Native American descent on his father's side, and Dutch and Irish on his mother's side. Taylor along with his mother and sister would often move around the country in search for job prospects. By the time he was 15, he had "already lived in 25 states". Around 1979, Taylor and his mother saw the sci-fi series Buck Rogers in the 25th Century. Before the series, there was a trailer for the 1978 horror film Halloween. Taylor said this "developed some sense of Slipknot in [himself]". While Halloween introduced Taylor to masks and horror themes, Taylor's grandmother introduced him to rock music, showing him a collection of Elvis Presley records from the 1950s to 1970s. He especially found songs like "Teddy Bear", "In the Ghetto", and "Suspicious Minds" to appeal to his interests the most, describing them as "good times". Taylor also began listening to Black Sabbath at a young age, beginning with their early work. He decided he wanted to become a singer when he and his cousin were singing along to Journey's Separate Ways.

In 1983, when he was nine years old, his mother and her boyfriend moved to Fort Lauderdale, Florida to become security guards for Burt Reynolds' ranch. However, as they were driving there, they got stranded in Georgia and lost some of his possessions. By age 15, he had developed a drug addiction and had overdosed on cocaine twice. By this time, he was living in Waterloo, but later set out on his own and ended up at his grandmother's house in Des Moines. She took legal custody of him so that he could continue going to school, and she helped him buy musical equipment. He would later describe his grandmother as his "strongest influence" as well as his "rock, foundation and stability." When Taylor was 18, he left his grandmother's house and went to various places in Iowa, Des Moines being a place to which he frequently returned. Taylor attended Lincoln High School in Des Moines although he dropped out.

In 2017, on an episode of Viceland's The Therapist, Taylor revealed that he was sexually abused at the age of 10 by a 16-year-old friend. Taylor stated that he never told anyone about the incident until he was "probably 18" because his abuser "threatened to hurt [him] and threatened to hurt [his] mom". At age 18, when Taylor was living with his grandmother, he attempted suicide by way of overdose. His ex-girlfriend's mother drove him to the hospital in Des Moines and doctors were able to resuscitate him. He describes this as the lowest point in his life. Taylor first met his father when he was 30 years old, and now has a relationship with him, although he said their paths do not cross that often.

Music career

Stone Sour

Taylor is a founding member of American hard rock band Stone Sour. After he formed the band in 1992 with drummer Joel Ekman, Shawn Economaki joined filling in the bass position, leaving the electric guitar position to be filled by Josh Rand. Stone Sour recorded a demo album in 1993, and another in 1994. In 1997, Taylor was approached by the metal band, Slipknot, resulting in him abandoning Stone Sour while they were recording a demo album with Sean McMahon at SR studios. Taylor did not return until five years later to record their debut album, Stone Sour in 2002. Both Taylor and guitarist Josh Rand contacted Jim Root, Slipknot's guitarist, and Shawn Economaki, Stone Sour's original bassist, to begin writing songs for their debut album. Drummer Joel Ekman came back on board as well. This "reformation" later resulted in Stone Sour recording at Catamount Studios in Cedar Falls, Iowa.

Their self-titled debut album was released August 27, 2002, and it debuted at number 46 on the Billboard 200. Their second album, Come What(ever) May debuted at number four on the Billboard 200. It was released August 1, 2006, and charted on several different charts. Live in Moscow is currently their only album specifically released only for download. During the recording of the album, drummer Joel Ekman left the band for personal reasons. As a result, drummer Roy Mayorga was recruited, taking his place. The group released their third studio album, Audio Secrecy, on September 7, 2010.

Later, Corey Taylor announced the release of a concept double album with Stone Sour. The albums are titled "House of Gold & Bones". During the process of making the double album, bassist Shawn Economaki left the band. He was temporarily replaced for touring purposes by Johny Chow. The first part was released in October 2012 and the second part in April 2013. There are 23 songs in total, 11 on the first part and 12 on the second. In addition to these two albums is a four-part comic book series written by Taylor and published by Dark Horse Comics, which went on sale in 2013. With these albums came a story that was written by Taylor that coincide with the album. Fans can also construct a miniature "house of gold and bones" from the packaging design of the physical versions of the two albums. Taylor has also said that he would like to finish off the project by making the story into a movie but nothing has come of this yet.

Slipknot

In Des Moines, Iowa, Joey Jordison, Shawn Crahan, and Mick Thomson approached him asking him to join Slipknot. He agreed to go to one of their practices, and ended up singing in front of them. Of Slipknot's nine members, Corey was the sixth to join the band. Performing with Slipknot, he would also come to be known as "Number Eight", since the band follows a numbering scheme for its members, ranging from 0–8. According to Shawn Crahan, Corey wanted number eight, because it symbolizes infinity.

Feeling he could expand more inside Slipknot than in Stone Sour, Taylor temporarily quit Stone Sour, even though they were recording an album with Sean McMahon. Taylor's first gig with Slipknot was on August 24, 1997, which according to band members did not go well. During his first gig, Taylor was performing with facepaint instead of a mask; however, for his second show on September 12, he wore a mask that resembles his debut album mask.
Taylor has recorded with Slipknot since the release of their second demo album, a self-titled demo used to promote the band to prospective labels and producers. As their permanent vocalist, he recorded with Slipknot at Indigo Ranch in Malibu, California, and released Slipknot, the band's debut album that peaked at number one on the Top Heatseekers chart, went double platinum in the United States, and was included in the 2006 book 1001 Albums You Must Hear Before You Die. Taylor was accused of copyright infringement regarding the lyrics of the song "Purity", but no action was taken. Taylor began recording for their second studio album, Iowa, in 2001 at Sound City and Sound Image in Van Nuys, Los Angeles. It was released August 28, 2001, and peaked at number one on the UK Albums Chart, as well as number three on the Billboard 200. While writing Vol. 3: (The Subliminal Verses), Taylor decided to write lyrics that would not warrant an explicit label. It peaked at number two on the Billboard 200. All Hope Is Gone was the first Slipknot album to peak at number one on the Billboard 200.

Other work
Taylor has appeared as a guest musician on albums by Soulfly, Apocalyptica, Damageplan, Steel Panther, and Code Orange. At one point, he was heavily involved in the recording of thrash metal band Anthrax's album, Worship Music, but the sessions remain unreleased. He also contributed to the Roadrunner United all-star album in 2005, providing vocals for the song "Rich Man". Taylor also made a brief appearance in Steel Panther's singles "Death to All but Metal", "Eyes of a Panther", and "Asian Hooker". In 2006, Taylor founded the record company Great Big Mouth Records. Taylor has produced two albums: Facecage's self-titled album and Walls of Jericho's Redemption. Taylor provided guest narration on the track "Repentance" for Dream Theater's 2007 album Systematic Chaos. In an interview with Billboard, Taylor confirmed that on January 13, 2009, he was planning on making a solo album, as well as returning to his side project Stone Sour after Slipknot's All Hope Is Gone World Tour. Taylor has stated that he was writing songs that "don't fit either of his main bands." He describes them as a cross between Foo Fighters, Johnny Cash, and Social Distortion, saying that there's "a country background that comes built-in with living in Iowa".

On March 30, 2009, it was confirmed that Taylor and the Junk Beer Kidnap Band would be performing at Rockfest in 2009. The group performed on April 24, 2009, at People's Court in Des Moines, Iowa, marking Taylor's first official solo show. Taylor performs with his band the Dum Fux with Denny Harvey, who make covers for 1970s punk rock and 1980s hair metal. Taylor also performs with Audacious P, a band that is primarily a Tenacious D cover band. Rapper Tech N9ne confirmed that Taylor was to perform on his album K.O.D., but was removed because Taylor did not submit his vocals in time. Taylor recently admitted that he tried out for the vacant singer spot in the band Velvet Revolver, but said that it just did not work out. However, according to a recent Billboard article, it seems likely that he may in fact become the vocalist for Velvet Revolver, though no official confirmation has been made. Duff McKagan added that they can neither "confirm or deny" Taylor's membership in the band but believes that Taylor is the "real deal". Slash has since ruled Taylor out as the possible new vocalist explaining that "[it] just wasn't right" although he does love him. Taylor has, however, recorded 10 new songs with the band, although drummer Matt Sorum stated it is unlikely they will ever be released. Taylor explained to Mark Hoppus on Hoppus on Music that he and McKagan were writing new music for a possible new supergroup.

On June 21, 2018, Taylor featured on the track "The Hunt" by metallic hardcore band Code Orange, the second track of the three-track EP The Hurt Will Go On. In April 2019, Taylor collaborated on the song "Drugs" by the band Falling in Reverse. In September 2019, he was featured on Nostalgia Critic's parody album of Pink Floyd's The Wall on a cover of the opening theme for SpongeBob SquarePants.
Taylor released his solo album, CMFT, on October 2, 2020, via Roadrunner Records. The first two singles, "Black Eyes Blue" and "CMFT Must Be Stopped", were released on July 29, 2020.

Taylor mentioned in an October 3, 2020, interview about a followup album entitled CMF2, which would be completed prior to a tour supporting both it and CMFT. He contributed a cover of the Metallica song "Holier Than Thou" to the charity tribute album The Metallica Blacklist, released in September 2021.

Style and influence

Taylor told Loudwire in 2015 that if it were not for Faith No More, he "wouldn't be here today". While recovering from an attempted suicide, he saw the band perform "Epic" live on the 1990 MTV Video Music Awards and the performance inspired him to begin writing and performing music again. He has also stated that Pearl Jam had hugely influenced and inspired his music, saying that the group was "one of the biggest and best rock bands of all time".

The first two Slipknot albums with Taylor's vocals, Slipknot and Iowa, both contain substantial explicit content. Many critics claimed Taylor relied on the profanity, which is why Slipknot's third album, Vol. 3: (The Subliminal Verses) is profanity-free, (with the exceptions of the word "bitch" on the song "Duality" and "bastard" on the spoken intro of "Pulse of the Maggots"), and did not warrant the explicit label. Compared with the previous vocalist for Slipknot, Anders Colsefni, Taylor has a vocal style that was characterized by the late, ex-drummer Joey Jordison as "really good melodic singing". Taylor's vocal style, which contains at times melodic singing, growling, screaming, shouting, and rapping, led him to place at number 86 on the Hit Parader's Top 100 Metal Vocalists of All Time and is often compared to other vocalists such as Ivan Moody, John Bush, Phil Anselmo, and Jamey Jasta.

Personal life
On September 17, 2002, Taylor's then-fiancée, Scarlett, gave birth to their son, Griffin. Taylor also has a daughter, Angeline, from an earlier relationship. Taylor and Scarlett married on March 11, 2004, and divorced in 2007. On November 13, 2009, Taylor married Stephanie Luby at the Palms Hotel in Las Vegas. They had a daughter, Rian, but separated in 2017. On April 7, 2019, it was announced on his Instagram page that he became engaged to Alicia Dove, creator of "Cherry Bombs". On October 6, 2019, the pair married.

Taylor has had problems with alcoholism, which Scarlett helped him through as well as keeping him from completing suicide. In 2006, Taylor told MTV that he had attempted to jump off a balcony of the eighth floor of The Hyatt on Sunset Boulevard in 2003, but "somehow [Scarlett] stopped me". This was later recanted by Taylor in an interview with Kerrang! radio and stated that it was, in fact, his friend Thom Hazaert who physically stopped him from jumping. Scarlett then told him that either he would have to get sober or she would annul their marriage. Before Stone Sour started recording Come What(ever) May in January 2006, Taylor was sober.

On August 3, 2009, he co-hosted the 2009 Kerrang! Awards alongside Scott Ian of Anthrax. The following year, they both once again co-hosted The Kerrang! Awards, where Taylor collected the K! Services to Metal award on behalf of Paul Gray, who died after an accidental overdose of morphine and fentanyl.

In early September 2010, Taylor announced that his book, Seven Deadly Sins: Settling The Argument Between Born Bad And Damaged Good, would be released on July 12, 2011, through Da Capo Press.

In August 2021, Taylor tested positive for COVID-19 after the conclusion of a solo tour in support of his album CMFT. He was symptomatic despite being vaccinated, and credited the vaccine for preventing him from becoming seriously ill.

Taylor politically identifies as a centrist and is also strongly opposed to cancel culture.

He divides his time between homes in Des Moines, Iowa and Las Vegas, Nevada.

In 2022, he had to have surgery in his neck after, in his own words, "broke [his] neck a while back [and] didn't realize it".

Discography

Studio albums

Singles

As lead artist

Guest appearances

Filmography

Bibliography

Equipment

Awards

Revolver Golden Gods Awards

|-
| 2010 || Corey Taylor || Best Vocalist || 
|-
| 2013 || Corey Taylor || Best Vocalist || 

Loudwire Music Awards

|-
| 2015 || Corey Taylor || Rock Titan || 
|-
| 2017 || Corey Taylor || Best Vocalist || 

Kerrang! Awards

|-
| 2018 || Corey Taylor || Legend ||

References

Bibliography

External links

 
Corey Taylor interview
Metal Underground: interview
NY rock: article
IGN: article
Duff McKagan on Corey Taylor in Seattle Weekly

 
 

1973 births
American heavy metal singers
American male singers
American male guitarists
American heavy metal guitarists
American baritones
20th-century American singers
21st-century American singers
American people of German descent
American people who self-identify as being of Native American descent
American people of Irish descent
American people of Dutch descent
Grammy Award winners
Musicians from Des Moines, Iowa
Living people
Writers from Des Moines, Iowa
Writers from Waterloo, Iowa
Native American male actors
Native American singers
Nu metal singers
Roadrunner Records artists
Slipknot (band) members
Stone Sour members
Singers with a five-octave vocal range
Singers from Iowa
Alternative metal musicians
American hard rock musicians
Male actors from Iowa
Teenage Time Killers members